Bjerkandera adusta, commonly known as the smoky polypore or smoky bracket, is a species of fungus in the family Meruliaceae. It is a plant pathogen that causes white rot in live trees, but most commonly appears on dead wood. It was first described scientifically as Boletus adustus by Carl Ludwig Willdenow in 1787. The genome sequence of Bjerkandera adusta was reported in 2013. The species is inedible.

Description
The fungus grows in shelflike fruit bodies which often overlap. The caps are tomentose to hairy and buff in colour.

The species is often found on decaying wood.

Bjerkandera fumosa is similar; its flesh has a dark line near the base of the tubes. Some members of the genera Stereum and Trametes are similar as well.

Chemistry
Because Bjerkandera adusta produces enzymes that can degrade polycyclic aromatic hydrocarbons, such as those used in synthetic textile dyes, there has been research interest in investigating the fungus for possible use in bioremediation. The research on these lignin-degrading enzymes produced by Bjerkandera adusta, such as versatile peroxidase, has also shown in studies to be able to decolorize synthetic melanin. This feature may allow Bjerkandera adusta to be utilized for melanin decolorization in future cosmetic applications.

References

Meruliaceae
Fungi of Europe
Fungal plant pathogens and diseases
Fungi described in 1787
Inedible fungi
Taxa named by Carl Ludwig Willdenow